The 2017 Alabama Crimson Tide football team represented the University of Alabama during the 2017 NCAA Division I FBS football season. This season marked the Crimson Tide's 123rd overall season, its 84th as a member of the Southeastern Conference (SEC) and its 26th within the SEC Western Division. They played their home games at Bryant–Denny Stadium in Tuscaloosa, Alabama and were led by eleventh-year head coach Nick Saban.

Alabama ended the season as consensus national champions by winning their second College Football Playoff national championship. This was their 17th claimed national title in school history and fifth under head coach Nick Saban.

Alabama, coming off a national title game loss to Clemson in 2016, began the year ranked first in the AP Poll. The team opened the year with a victory over then-No. 3 Florida State in the Chick-fil-A Kickoff Game, which was the highest ranked season-opening match-up in the history of the AP Poll. Alabama won their first 11 games convincingly, but fell on the road to rival Auburn in the regular season finale, and since the two teams were tied atop the SEC West Division at 7–1, Auburn advanced to the 2017 SEC Championship Game on the head-to-head tiebreaker. Alabama fell to number six in the rankings leading up to conference championship weekend. In the final College Football Playoff rankings of the year, 11–1 Alabama rose to number four after sitting idle, ahead of 12–1 Wisconsin, 11–2 Big Ten Conference champion Ohio State and 12–0 American Athletic Conference champion UCF. This earned Alabama a place in the national semi-final to be played at the Sugar Bowl against first-seeded Clemson, the third consecutive playoff meeting between the two schools. Alabama won by a score of 24–6 and advanced to the 2018 College Football Playoff National Championship against SEC champion Georgia. The Crimson Tide pulled off an overtime victory to win the game 26–23 and the national title.

Alabama's offense was led by sophomore quarterback Jalen Hurts, who finished with 2,081 passing yards, 17 passing touchdowns and just one interception. He added 855 rushing yards and 8 rushing touchdowns on the ground. Freshman quarterback Tua Tagovailoa served as the backup and was named game MVP of the national championship game after Hurts was benched at halftime. Running back Damien Harris led the rushing attack with exactly 1,000 rushing yards and 11 touchdowns on the year. Wide receiver Calvin Ridley and offensive tackle Jonah Williams were named first-team All-SEC. The Crimson Tide defense, which led the country in scoring and yards allowed, was led by consensus first-team All-American and Chuck Bednarik Award-winning safety Minkah Fitzpatrick. He was joined on the All-SEC team by defensive tackles Daron Payne and Raekwon Davis, linebacker Rashaan Evans, and safety Ronnie Harrison.

Previous season and offseason 

In 2016, Alabama came into the season ranked No. 1 in both preseason polls and finished the regular season 13–0, 8–0 SEC. The Crimson Tide were ranked number one the entire season prior to their national championship appearance against Clemson. Alabama won the Western Division of SEC and qualified to play in the 2016 SEC Championship Game against the Florida Gators. Alabama defeated the Gators again in the rematch from the previous year's SEC Championship 54–16 in Atlanta, Georgia, clinching the program's 26th SEC title. As the No. 1 seed in the third season of the College Football Playoff, the Crimson Tide were selected to play in the semifinal game at the 2016 Peach Bowl against No. 4 Washington of the Pac-12 Conference. Alabama beat the Huskies 24–7, advancing them to the 2017 College Football Playoff National Championship Game against No. 2 Clemson of the Atlantic Coast Conference. The Crimson Tide lost to the Tigers in the rematch from the previous year's College Football Playoff National Championship 35–31 after Deshaun Watson threw the game-winning TD pass to Hunter Renfrow with :01 left. The Crimson Tide finished the 2016 season with a record of 14–1.

Departures
The Crimson Tide lost twenty-three senior football players to graduation, another four players to the NFL Draft, and four more players from the 2016 team due to various other reasons.

Preseason

2017 recruiting class
Alabama signed 29 recruits in its 2017 recruiting class. The class was highlighted by 19 players from the "ESPN 300". Alabama signed the No. 1 recruiting class according to Rivals.com, Scout.com, 247Sports.com, and ESPN.

Returning starters
Alabama returned six starters on offense, six on defense, and one on special teams from the 2016 team.

Offense

Defense

Special teams

Spring game

Alabama's annual A-Day spring game was held on April 22, 2017. Kicker J. K. Scott kicked a field goal as time expired to win the game for the Jalen Hurts-led Crimson team over the Tua Tagovailoa-led White team.

Schedule

Schedule Source:

Game summaries

vs. Florida State 

Sources:

 
The Tide opened the season in the brand new Mercedes-Benz Stadium in Atlanta, Georgia against No. 3-ranked Florida State. Alabama came into the game with the mantra "Don't waste a failure", a reference to the disappointing loss to Clemson in the previous season's 2017 CFP National Championship game. Although having a competitive first half, the game was considered by some to fall short of preseason expectations. Furthermore, Florida State would post a disappointing 7–6 record on the year, due in part to a season ending injury to starting QB Deondre Francois in the fourth quarter, failing to deliver on much of the game's promised impact. The game for Alabama would also prove somewhat of a pyrrhic victory as linebackers Terrell Lewis and Christian Miller would be out with significant injuries, a theme that would continue to haunt the Alabama defense for the entirety of the regular season.

The first half was characterized largely as a defensive struggle for both teams. After a turnover on downs stop by the Alabama defense on fourth and 2, the offense would march down the field for a 36-yard Andy Pappanastos field goal (ALA 3 FSU 0) late in the first quarter. FSU would respond with a drive of their own culminating in a 3-yard pass to Auden Tate (ALA 3 FSU 7) which was matched by a 53-yard bomb from Alabama's Jalen Hurts to Calvin Ridley for a touchdown on Alabama's next drive (ALA 10 FSU 3). Both teams would hold the other's offense to minimal production for the rest of the half including a blocked FG attempt by FSU from Alabama's Minkah Fitzpatrick.

Florida State would open the second half with a promising drive that stalled at midfield after an Alabama sack. After a few possession exchanges, Alabama would find itself in prime position to score after a punt attempt by Florida State was blocked and recovered by Alabama deep in FSU territory. This would culminate in an Andy Pappanastos FG for 25 yards (ALA 13 FSU 7). On the ensuing kick return, Alabama's Dylan Moses would force a fumble recovered by Alabama, and on the first play of Alabama's drive, Damien Harris would score on a rushing touchdown from 11 yards out. Alabama would come away with a successful two-point conversion attempt after the touchdown to go up by two touchdowns (ALA 21 FSU 7). For the rest of the game, the Alabama defense would dominate FSU including picking off two passes by Deondre Francois. Alabama would kick one more field goal late in the game from 33 yards out (ALA 24 FSU 7) to seal the Alabama victory. The Alabama defense held the Seminoles to 40 yards rushing. Bama quarterback Jalen Hurts completed 10 of 17 passes for 96 yards and one touchdown while Damien Harris ran for 73 yards and a touchdown.

Statistics

Fresno State 

Sources:

The Tide welcomed Fresno State to Bryant-Denny Stadium for their first home game of the season in what would be a predictable blowout of the talented but outmatched Bulldogs, a team that would go on to play in the Mountain West Championship Game.

Alabama would start the game on offense to begin the first quarter. On the second play of Alabama's opening drive, QB Jalen Hurts would run for a 55-yard touchdown. Alabama would also score a touchdown on their next possession in a 23-yard Jalen Hurts pass to Hale Hentges, and again on the drive after that in a 4-yard Bo Scarbrough run as time expired on the first quarter. During this time, Fresno State would put together a respectable 70 yard drive for a field goal. (ALA 21 FRESNO 3). In the second quarter, Alabama would  see a Damien Harris touchdown run from five yards out late in the second quarter while Fresno State would stall on their last possession of the half (ALA 28 FRESNO 3).

In the second half, Alabama would put together a drive which culminated in an Andy Pappanastos FG from 24 yards out in the third quarter before pulling starting QB Jalen Hurts for the backup QB and future CFP National Championship game offensive MVP Tua Tagovailoa. (ALA 31 FRESNO 3). In the fourth quarter, Tua would engineer a field goal and touchdown drive in a 16-yard pass to Henry Ruggs III for Alabama while Fresno State would find the endzone after a 63-yard punt return and 26 yard touchdown pass from QB Chason Virgil to Derrion Grim. (ALA 41 FRESNO 10). The Alabama defense held the Bulldogs to 58 yards rushing while the Tide amassed 305 yards on the ground.

Statistics

Colorado State 

Sources:
 

Alabama welcomed the (2–1) Colorado State Rams for the second home game of the season who were led by third year head coach Mike Bobo. Although Alabama would win convincingly, this game was marked by several momentum shifts which benefited Colorado State against the Alabama defense (lacking several key starters due to injury) early in the game and at the end of the game during garbage time. Offensively, Alabama would post a strong 487 yards, including passing and rushing touchdowns from Alabama QB Jalen Hurts. Colorado State would go on to post a winning 7–6 Record on the year and finish second in their division within the Mountain West Conference.

Alabama received the ball to start the game and would score on this drive and its next two drives. The first culminated in a Jalen Hurts 27 yard run, the second with a 78-yard touchdown pass to Calvin Ridley, and the third an Andy Pappanastos field goal from 46 yards out (ALA 17 CSU 0). Although the Alabama defense would hold CSU to no points in the first quarter, CSU would engineer two lengthy drives comprising a field goal and touchdown off strong passing proficiency from CSU QB Nick Stevens (ALA 17 CSU 10). The Alabama offense would rally though late in the second quarter wherein Jalen Hurts would find Robert Foster for a 52 passing touchdown. (ALA 24 CSU 10) to effectively end the first half.

In the second half, Nick Stevens would be picked off two times in the third quarter which Alabama would capitalize on in both situations for touchdowns, one in a Bo Scarbrough run for 9 yards for a TD and another in a Damien Harris run for 5 yards for a TD, virtually guaranteeing the Alabama win (ALA 38 CSU 10). In the fourth quarter, the Alabama defense would give up two touchdown drives while the Alabama offense, under the control of backup QB Tua Tagovailoa, would post a field goal to end the game. (ALA 41 CSU 23).

Statistics

at Vanderbilt 

Sources:

Alabama opened up its SEC schedule with a road game (though 75% of the stadium were Alabama fans) against a (3–0) Vanderbilt Commodores team led by 4th season head coach, Derek Mason. Vanderbilt came into the game off a ranked win over then AP ranked number 17 Kansas State of the Big 12 conference, the first time since 1946 that Vanderbilt beat an AP ranked non-SEC opponent. In addition, Vanderbilt posted a then top 20 defense and had a team return 16 starters from last season. At the end of the Kansas State game, Vanderbilt stadium erupted in chants of “We want Bama!”, a running gag of sorts within college football at the time. Vanderbilt defensive lineman Nifae Lealao was also interviewed after the Kansas State game, stating “When you come to our house, we show you how to play some SEC ball. It don’t matter where you from…Alabama, you’re next” which was republished throughout the week by various outlets in the lead up to the game. Alabama would win the game 59–0, post a school record 38 first downs and a school record margin of total offense of 599 yards (677 yards Alabama to Vanderbilt's 78).

Vanderbilt had the first possession of the game which was intercepted four plays into the drive by Alabama's Ronnie Harrison. Although Alabama would not capitalize on this turnover, on their next four possessions afterwards they would find the endzone for four rushing touchdowns. The first came off a run by Bo Scarbrough from 6 yards out, the second a 61-yard Damien Harris run, the third (off a fumble recovery forced by Anfernee Jennings) a methodical rushing drive culminating in a 2-yard Damien Harris touchdown, and the fourth another rushing drive which ended with a 2-yard rushing touchdown for Bo Scarbrough. (ALA 28 VANDY 0). Alabama would tack on one more field goal in the second quarter and Vanderbilt would be held to very minimal offensive production (ALA 31 VANDY 0).

Alabama opened the second half with a drive consisting largely of the run ending in a 2-yard rushing touchdown for Damien Harris. This drive was the last for starting QB Jalen Hurts who was 9/17 for 78 yards through the air and 48 yards on the ground. After a Vanderbilt 3 and out, Alabama backup QB Tua Tagovailoa would play for the remainder of the game, accounting for two passing touchdowns, one to Jerry Jeudy from 34 yards out and one to DeVonta Smith from 27 yards out. Alabama would tack on one more touchdown with the help of a long passing play to set up a 17-yard run from Brian Robinson Jr. (ALA 59 VANDY 0).

The shift between Hurts and Tagovailoa was marked by a dramatic shift in playcalling and offensive scheme which was representative of the strengths of each quarterback. Drives orchestrated by Hurts tended to use an offensive scheme developed by former OC Lane Kiffin: a hybrid between an option offense for running schemes and a west-coast offense characterized by running veers and horizontal passing attacks. However, the offensive scheme under Tagovailoa resembled a traditional pro-style offense, a scheme that then OC Brian Daboll favored, which emphasize pocket presence, multiple downfield reads, play-action, vertical passing, and between-the-tackles-running. This difference in playcalling would arise down the line as a major factor in Alabama's come from behind win against Georgia in the 2018 CFP National Championship Game (see Georgia below).

Statistics

Ole Miss 

Sources:

Alabama welcomed the Ole Miss Rebels to Tuscaloosa for Alabama's first intradivisional match-up. Although Alabama was heavily favored going into this game, the recent history of this meeting was a tumultuous  one for Alabama, having lost to Ole Miss in 2014 and 2015 and narrowly avoiding losing to them in 2016 (Alabama at one point trailed 24 to 3 and required a come from behind victory in the fourth quarter). However 2017 Ole Miss was coached by interim coach Matt Luke and not previous head-coach Hugh Freeze (who coached Ole Miss from 2012 through the 2016 Ole Miss seasons). This was a result of a sudden departure of Hugh Freeze during the off-season who was all but forced to resign when it came to light that, during Ole Miss' more public legal dispute between itself and former Ole Miss Head Coach Houston Nutt, a "concerning pattern" of behavior came to light wherein Ole Miss was made aware of several call logs between Hugh Freeze and a female escort service. As such, Ole Miss was in less of a position (due to off-the-field distractions) to cause Alabama trouble as it had in the past, resulting in an obliterating 66–3 Score.

In the first quarter, Alabama would find the endzone three times. Two of these scores were on offense the first being the result of favorable starting position that culminated in a 6-yard Bo Scarbrough rushing touchdown (ALA 7, MISS 0) and the second a long 85 yard drive comprising a spectacular 60-yard reception from Cam Sims that culminated in a 3-yard Hale Hentges reception. These two scores bookended an interception for a touchdown from Levi Wallace (ALA 21–3). Ole Miss would find the score board off a field goal late in the first from 26-yards out by kicker Gary Wunderlich. (ALA 21 MISS 3). The second quarter, more quiet than the first, included a Jalen Hurts pass to Josh Jacobs from 18-yards out (ALA 28 MISS 3) and another drive off a short field in two back-to-back Jalen Hurts rushes (ALA 35 MISS 3).

As Ole Miss started the game with possession, Alabama would receive the ball to start the second half which would culminate in a beautiful 48-yard kick from J. K. Scott (ALA 38 MISS 3). By this point, Ole Miss could not generate any form of offense or defense, allowing Alabama to simply pile on drive after drive, including a 4-yard Najee Harris run for a touchdown (ALA 45 MISS 3), then (after a QB exchange and off the back of a 45-yard Josh Jacobs rush) a 3-yard rush from back-up QB Tua Tagovailoa (ALA 52 MISS 3), then (off another Levi Wallace interception) an 8-yard pass from Tagovailoa to Henry Ruggs III (ALA 59 MISS 3), and finally a 91-yard drive lasting over 8 in-game minutes that culminated in a Ronnie Clark 9-yard run (ALA 66 MISS 3). This was Alabama's largest margin-of-victory since 1979. However, in line with the rest of the season, Alabama linebacker Da'Shawn Hand would be injured in the third quarter, further depleting Alabama's already sparse defensive backfield.

Statistics

at Texas A&M 

Sources:

Alabama next traveled to SEC West foe Texas A&M (4–1, 2–0 SEC), and were 26.5-point favorites in the game. The game ended up being closer than expected, as Alabama pulled out a 27–19 victory.

Texas A&M took an early lead with a 52-yard field goal by Daniel LaCamera in the first quarter. On the very next offensive play for Alabama, running back Damien Harris broke off a 75-yard touchdown run. The Crimson Tide added a field goal by Andy Pappanastos and a one-yard touchdown run by Jalen Hurts in the second quarter to make the score 17–3 at the half.

Alabama's opening drive of the second half was a nine-play, 75-yard drive that ended with an eight-yard touchdown pass from Hurts to Henry Ruggs III. On their next drive, Alabama's Robert Foster fumbled the ball, which the Aggies recovered on the Alabama 36 yard line. Texas A&M took advantage of the opportunity and scored via a two-yard touchdown pass from Kellen Mond to Christian Kirk. Texas A&M's next drive ended with an interception by Minkah Fitzpatrick near Alabama's goal line. Four plays later, Alabama was forced to punt out of their own end zone, and the kick was blocked for a safety, after which the score was 24–12 Alabama. Alabama kicked a 44-yard field goal with 2:09 left to play, and then Texas A&M led a touchdown drive in the final minutes that ended with a one-yard Kellen Mond touchdown run to make the score 27–19 with 17 seconds remaining. The Aggies failed to convert an onside kick and Alabama ran out the clock to end the game. Damien Harris finished with 124 yards and a touchdown in the game.

Statistics

Arkansas 

Sources:

Alabama next hosted SEC West foe Arkansas, who was 2–3 (0–2 SEC) at the time of the game. The Crimson Tide won in a blowout, 41–9.

On the very first offensive play of the game, Alabama's Damien Harris ran for a 75-yard touchdown. Arkansas's first drive resulted in a three-and-out followed by a fumbled snap by the punter, resulting in a turnover on downs at the Arkansas 25. Alabama answered with a 39-yard field goal. After another Arkansas three-and-out, Alabama completed a 65-yard drive that ended with a four-yard score by Damien Harris, after which the score was 17–0 midway through the first quarter. Alabama struggled to move the ball for their next few drives, but scored again in the final two minutes of the half via an 11-yard touchdown run by Jalen Hurts, and the score was 24–0 at halftime.

Alabama's first drive in the second half ended with a Jalen Hurts interception to Arkansas's Kevin Richardson II, after which Arkansas scored their first points of the day via a 30-yard field goal. Hurts responded with a 20-yard touchdown pass to Henry Ruggs III on the next drive. Alabama's first drive of the fourth quarter ended with a four-yard touchdown run by freshman Najee Harris. Arkansas's first touchdown came with 3:03 left to go via a three-yard touchdown pass from Cole Kelley to Jordan Jones, after which Alabama ran out with the clock with a final score of 41–9. Damien Harris finished with 125 yards and two touchdowns on just nine carries in the game.

Statistics

Tennessee 

Sources:

Alabama next hosted its protected East Division rival Tennessee. Alabama won in a blowout, 45–7, their 11th straight win in the series.

Tennessee received the opening kickoff but was forced to punt after three plays. Alabama's first drive was a 12-play, 63-yard drive that ended in a one-yard touchdown run by Bo Scarbrough. In the second quarter, an 85-yard drive ended in another one-yard score by Scarbrough, and with 1:18 remaining in the half, Damien Harris capped a 77-yard drive with an 11-yard touchdown run. The score was 21–0 at halftime.

Alabama's opening drive of the second half ended with a 14-yard touchdown pass from Jalen Hurts to Irv Smith Jr. Tua Tagovailoa came in at quarterback and led a drive down to the Tennessee 5 yard line, but Tennessee's Daniel Bituli intercepted a pass and returned it for a 97-yard score for Tennessee's only points on the day. Tagovailoa added a 23-yard rushing touchdown and a 60-yard passing touchdown to Henry Ruggs III before the end of the game to make the score 45–7 at the final horn. Alabama out-gained Tennessee 604 to 108 in total yards on the day.

Statistics

LSU 

Sources:

Alabama next faced their second ranked opponent of the year in a home game against SEC West foe No. 18 LSU. In a low-scoring game for the Tide, Alabama led by two scores for most of the game and won by a score of 24–10.

Alabama got on the board first after a 90-yard drive ended with a four-yard touchdown pass from Jalen Hurts to Irv Smith Jr. Late in the first quarter, Alabama safety Ronnie Harrison intercepted a pass from LSU's Danny Etling at the LSU 37, after which Bo Scarbrough ran for a nine-yard touchdown run to make the score 14–0. LSU's next drive moved the ball to the Alabama 4 yard line but the Tigers settled for a 21-yard field goal. The score was 14–3 at halftime.

The teams struggled to move the ball at the start of the second half, until Jalen Hurts capped a 56-yard drive with a three-yard touchdown run late in the third quarter. LSU responded with their own touchdown drive, in which Darrel Williams ran for a 54-yard run to the Alabama 2 yard line and ran in for the score two plays later. Alabama's Andy Pappanastos kicked a 40-yard field goal to make the score 24–10 with 13:25 left to play. The Alabama defense was the story for the rest of the game, as LSU accumulated only 24 yards on three drives in the final 13 minutes, while the Alabama offense did not score.

Statistics

at Mississippi State 

Sources:

After defeating LSU, Alabama traveled to play No. 19 Mississippi State. Alabama pulled ahead late to secure a 31–24 victory.

Mississippi State opened the scoring with an 11-yard touchdown run from Aeris Williams on their second drive. Alabama responded with a 65-yard drive that included a 63-yard pass from Jalen Hurts to Calvin Ridley and ended with a one-yard touchdown run from Hurts. Mississippi State's next drive again ended with an Aeris Williams touchdown run, this time from five yards out. Once again, Alabama responded with a touchdown drive, as Hurts connected with Ridley again for a 61-yard pass and Josh Jacobs ended the drive with a one-yard run. Both teams failed to score for the last nine minutes of the half, and the 14–14 score carried into halftime.

Alabama received the second half kickoff and advanced to the Mississippi State 12 yard line but settled for a 30-yard field goal from Andy Pappanastos. The Bulldogs then went on a 13-play, 69-yard drive that ended with a two-yard touchdown run by quarterback Nick Fitzgerald to take the lead. The Bulldogs extended their lead to seven points early in the fourth quarter with a 25-yard field goal. Alabama tied the game with a 14-yard touchdown run by Damien Harris with 9:49 left to go. A would-be go-ahead 41-yard field goal from Alabama missed with 2:03 left to go, but Alabama forced a Mississippi State three-and-out and got the ball back with 1:01 left on the clock. Jalen Hurts marched the team down the field and scored the go-ahead touchdown via a 26-yard pass to DeVonta Smith with 25 seconds left. Mississippi State attempted a Hail Mary pass as time expired, but the pass sailed out of the endzone and the game ended at 31–24 Alabama.

Statistics

Mercer 

Sources:

 
Alabama next returned home for their final non-conference game against FCS opponent Mercer. Alabama won in a predictable blowout, 56–0.

Alabama's first five possessions of the first half all ended with touchdowns. The first came from an eight-yard pass from Jalen Hurts to Irv Smith Jr., followed by a three-yard score by Najee Harris. Hurts threw two more touchdown passes in the first half via a 66-yard pass to Calvin Ridley and a seven-yard pass to Josh Jacobs. Tua Tagovailoa threw a four-yard touchdown pass to Hale Hentges in the second quarter. In the second half, Alabama was forced to punt once before rattling off three more touchdown drives with mostly backups on the field to bring the score to 56–0.

Statistics

at Auburn 

Sources:

In the final game of the regular season, Alabama traveled to play in-state rival No. 6 Auburn in the 82nd Iron Bowl. Two weeks earlier, Auburn had defeated then-No. 2 Georgia at home, and could claim the West Division title with another home win against the top-ranked Crimson Tide. Auburn did just that, pulling off the 26–14 victory. It was Auburn's first win in the rivalry since upsetting top-ranked Alabama in 2013 in a game known as the Kick Six.

In Auburn's second drive of the game, the Tigers led a 12-play, 95-yard drive that ended with a three-yard touchdown pass from running back Kerryon Johnson to Nate Craig-Myers. Alabama's next drive ended with a fumble by Jalen Hurts. Auburn got as far as the Alabama 4 yard line but quarterback Jarrett Stidham fumbled the ball as well. Two drives later, Alabama tied the game with a 36-yard pass from Jalen Hurts to Jerry Jeudy. Auburn kicked a 33-yard field goal as time expired in the second quarter to make the score 10–7 Auburn at halftime.

Alabama received the second half kickoff and took the lead with a 21-yard touchdown run by Bo Scarbrough. Auburn was able to score on its next two drives via a 44-yard field goal and then a one-yard touchdown run by Kerryon Johnson, making the score 20–14 Auburn. Alabama's next drive ended with a botched field goal snap and a turnover on downs. Auburn then extended their lead early in the fourth quarter with a 16-yard touchdown run by Jarrett Stidham. Auburn failed on the two-point attempt, and the score was 26–14. Alabama's next two drives were both lengthy but ended with failed fourth down attempts and turnovers on downs. Auburn got the ball with 2:21 left to go and was able to wind down the clock to win the game.

Statistics

vs. Clemson (Sugar Bowl) 

Sources:

During the Final Selection Day by the College Football Playoff committee held on December 3, 2017, Alabama was selected over the only other serious contenders, the Ohio State Buckeyes and the Wisconsin Badgers, for inclusion in the CFP at number 4. This decision was controversial for some media outlets and commentators. Wisconsin was 12-0 heading into the Big Ten Championship and had a Playoff spot locked up if they were to win, but they lost 27-21 to Ohio State, who was 10-2. Neither the Buckeyes nor the Badgers would receive the 4th Playoff spot, as Ohio State had 2 losses (including a 55-24 drubbing by Iowa) and Wisconsin had a weak strength of schedule compared to other Playoff contenders.

Going into the game Alabama was looking to avenge losing on the last play of the game during the 2016 College Football National Championship Game against Clemson and to prove they belonged in the CFP after their controversial inclusion. At the beginning of the game, Alabama won the coin toss and elected to defer their choice to the second half. The game was marked throughout the game by strong defensive performances by both Clemson and a healthy, rejuvenated Alabama defense. During the middle of the first quarter, Alabama had an opportunity in the red zone stalled and settled for a 24-yard field goal from kicker Andy Pappanastos (AL 3 – CLEM 0). After another 3 and out by Clemson, Alabama would, with great field position, drive down the field which culminated in a 12-yard pass from QB Jalen Hurts to Calvin Ridley (AL 10 – CLEM 0). Clemson, however would respond in the second quarter with a drive which ended with a 44-yard FG from Clemson kicker Alex Spence(AL 10 – CLEM 3). Defensive performances by both teams would keep this score the same going into the half.

In the second half, Alabama would receive the ball but uncharacteristically fumbled deep in their own territory on a muffed handoff between QB Jalen Hurts and RB Damien Harris. A strong Alabama defensive response would limit this turnover to a 42-yard Alex Spence FG (AL 10 – CLEM 6). After an Alabama three and out, a promising Clemson drive would be cut short when Clemson QB Kelly Bryant was tackled as he threw the ball causing it to wobble into the arms of Alabama defensive tackle Daron Payne for an interception. Alabama would capitalize on this momentum with a drive into the Clemson redzone, where, on second and goal, Alabama would bring in their goal line set which includes Payne as a downhill blocker fullback. However, instead of running Payne up the middle, he would roll out for a 1-yard reception from Jalen Hurts (AL 17- CLEM 6) in what is affectionately known as a "big man touchdown".  On the first play of Clemson's next drive, Kelly Bryant's intended pass to Deon Cain was deflected by Alabama's Levi Wallace into the arms of Mack Wilson for an interception returned for a touchdown (ALA 24 CLEM 6). The Alabama defense would control Clemson for the remainder of the 3rd and 4th quarter, ending the game (ALA 24 CLEM 6).

Statistics

vs. Georgia (CFP National Championship) 

Sources:

After Alabama's win in the CFP Semi-final in the Sugar Bowl over Clemson and Georgia's overtime win over Oklahoma in the Rose Bowl, Alabama and Georgia, who did not play during SEC play, were slated to play on January 8, 2018 in the Mercedes-Benz Dome in Atlanta, Georgia for the 2018 College Football National Championship Game. This game marked the first time ex-Defensive Coordinator for Alabama Kirby Smart, head coach of Georgia faced off against his mentor Nick Saban.

Alabama won the coin toss and elected to defer. On Georgia's opening drive, Alabama's Tony Brown intercepted a pass intended for Georgia's Riley Ridley, the younger brother of Alabama's Calvin Ridley. Alabama used this momentum to get Andy Pappanastos in a position for a 40-yard field goal, which he shanked badly to the left. This was Alabama's only meaningful offensive production for the entire half. On the Georgia side, Georgia QB Jake Fromm utilized a very effective balanced offensive to stress an increasingly exhausted Alabama defense (due to a combination of abysmal offensive production by Alabama and excellent, preternatural play from the Georgia offense). During the middle of the first quarter, on third and 20, the Alabama defense were gashed by Georgia's Sony Michel for 26 yards to get within field goal range. The Alabama defense tightened up and held Georgia to a completed 41-yard field goal from Georgia's Rodrigo Blankenship (AL 0 GA 3). After another Alabama three and out, Georgia again marched down the field to the Alabama red zone.  Again, Alabama held Georgia to a field goal, this time from 27 yards (AL 0 GA 6). Alabama and Georgia traded minimal drives until Georgia gained possession of the ball with 1:12 left in the half. On this drive, which included a strong QB run from Jake Fromm, Georgia ultimately capitalized on a tired and frustrated Alabama defense with a 1-yard touchdown run by Georgia Mecole Hardman (AL 0 GA 13). Alabama took a knee to end the half.

Alabama received the ball to start the half, with one significant modification of personnel: benching two-year starting QB Jalen Hurts for true freshman Hawaiian phenom Tua Tagovailoa. Though Alabama did not see an immediate benefit—their first drive going for a three and out—Tua almost single-handedly resurrected a rudderless Alabama offense.

After holding Georgia to a three and out, a reinvigorated Alabama offense faced a third down and 7 near midfield.  Tua eluded four unblocked defenders in the backfield and ran for an Alabama first down. Capturing the momentum, Alabama sealed the drive with a 6-yard strike from Tua to Henry Ruggs III (AL 7 GA 13). Four plays into Georgia's next drive, on third and long, Fromm threw an 80-yard pass to Mecole Hardman for a touchdown (AL 7 GA 20), negating Alabama's gain. Worse yet for Alabama, on its next possession, Tua was picked off deep in Alabama territory on an ill-advised pass.  At the brink of collapse, Alabama received a godsend on the very next play in a deflected Jake Fromm pass for an Alabama interception by Raekwon Davis. Using this sudden turnover, Alabama drove into field goal range with a 43-yard Andy Pappanastos field goal (AL 10 GA 20). Alabama and Georgia traded minimal drives to end the third quarter. On Georgia's first drive of the fourth quarter, the beleaguered Alabama defense once more stood tall and allowed Alabama to get the ball back. During Alabama's first drive of the fourth quarter, another freshman phenom, RB Najee Harris, put the Alabama offense in position for another completed FG, this time from 30 yards (AL 13 GA 20). After stopping Georgia on its next possession, Alabama again drove down the field.  On fourth down and 4, deep in Georgia territory, Alabama elected to go for the touchdown instead of kicking another field goal. Tua's pass was completed into triple coverage to Calvin Ridley for a 7-yard touchdown (AL 20 GA 20). The exhausted Alabama defense proved once again their mettle and held Georgia to a three and out. In prime position with 2:50 left in the game, Alabama drove down the field and set up a potentially game-winning field goal with three seconds left on the clock. However, reminiscent of his first kick of the game, Andy Pappanastos, missed wide left from 36 yards out, sending the game into overtime.

In overtime, Alabama again won the coin toss and elected to play defense. For the last time, the Alabama defense stood tall with a Terrell Lewis sack of Jake Fromm for a 13-yard loss. Despite the distance, a stellar 51-yard kick for from Rodrigo Blankenship put Georgia up. (AL 20 GA 23). On Alabama's first play of their drive, Tua, showing his inexperience, attempted to outmaneuver two unblocked defenders in the backfield instead of throwing the ball away, putting Alabama back 16 yards. With everything on the line, instead of trying to get some of the yards back, Alabama elected to run what it calls "Seattle," a play designed for long passes. Tua, recognizing Cover 2 in the back, shifted the safety as far to the middle of the field as he could with his eyes, and then immediately threw a pass to freshman DeVonta Smith for 41 yards and the game-winning touchdown (AL 26 – GA 23). This was Alabama's 17th claimed national championship, 11th AP National Championship, and fifth in nine years for Head Coach Nick Saban.

Statistics

Rankings

Coaching staff

Graduate Assistant
Mike Miller
 Nick Perry
Kyle Pope
Analysts

William Vlachos
Wes Neighbors
Chris Weinke
Shea Tierney
Garrett Cox
Dean Altobelli
Brendan Farrell
Rob Ezell
Alex Mortensen
Dan Werner
Brian Niedermeyer
 Freddie Roach

Roster

Depth chart 
As of the Crimson Tide's opening game against Florida State:

Statistics

Team

Offense

Defense
Key: POS: Position, SOLO: Solo Tackles, AST: Assisted Tackles, TOT: Total Tackles, TFL: Tackles-for-loss, SACK: Quarterback Sacks, INT: Interceptions, BRK: Pass Breakups, FF: Forced Fumbles, FR: Fumbles Recovered, BLK: Kicks or Punts Blocked

Special teams

Scores by quarter (all opponents)

Awards and honors

Post-season finalists and winners

Bronko-Nagurski Trophy: Defensive Player of the Year
 Minkah Fitzpatrick (finalist)

Broyles Award: Assistant Coach of the Year
 Brian Daboll (finalist)

Chuck Bednarik Award: Defensive Player of the Year 
 Minkah Fitzpatrick (finalist and winner)

George Munger Award: Head Coach of the Year 
 Nick Saban (finalist and winner)

Jim Thorpe Award: Nation's Best Defensive Back 
 Minkah Fitzpatrick (finalist and winner)

 Ray Guy Award: Nation's Best Punter 
 J. K. Scott (finalist)

 Rimington Trophy: Nation's Best Center 
 Bradley Bozeman (finalist)

 Walter Camp Award: Player of the Year 
 Minkah Fitzpatrick (finalist)

All-American Voting from Major Selectors

Associated Press (AP), American Football Coaches Association (AFCA), Football Writers Association of America (FWAA), The Sporting News (TSN), Walter Camp Football Foundation (WCFF)

All-SEC Selections

The Crimson Tide had twelve players honored as members of the first or second team 2017 SEC All-Conference team as listed by either the AP poll or the Coaches Poll of the Southeastern Conference. The selections are listed below for each poll.

Midseason Awards

SEC Defensive Player of the Week
 Shaun Dion Hamilton (v. Florida State, Week 1)
 Levi Wallace (v. Ole Miss, Week 5), (v. Tennessee, Week 8)
 Minkah Fitzpatrick (v. Texas A&M, Week 6)
 Ronnie Harrison (v. LSU, Week 10)

SEC Offensive Line Player of the Week
 Matt Womack (v. Fresno State, Week 2)
 Jonah Williams (v. Arkansas, Week 7)
 J. C. Hassenauer (v. Mercer, Week 12)

SEC Special Teams Player of the Week 
 J. K. Scott (v. LSU, Week 10)

Senior Bowl

The following players were invited to participate in the 2018 Senior Bowl: 
Bradley Bozeman
Da'Shawn Hand
J. K. Scott
Levi Wallace

2018 NFL Draft

The 2018 NFL Draft was held on April 26–28 in Arlington, Texas. A school- and SEC-record 12 Alabama players were selected as part of the draft. Four additional players were signed to NFL teams as undrafted free agents.

References

Alabama
Alabama Crimson Tide football seasons
College Football Playoff National Champions
Sugar Bowl champion seasons
Alabama Crimson Tide football